Cart with Black Ox, or The Ox-Cart, is an oil painting created in 1884 by Vincent van Gogh. It has been cited as one of his important early works.

Description
Created in the village of Nuenen before Van Gogh went to the South of France, the painting has a dark palette and has been described as "disquieting"; the ox and cart are both decrepit.

Cart with Black Ox was owned by a family who had bought it in 1950.

Curator Bruce Guenther argued, "The way the wheel becomes a definition lifted off the surface of the painting with the brush is Van Gogh establishing his vocabulary as a painter. He becomes Van Gogh here."

In 2010, the painting was analyzed by digital X-ray and CT scanning to look for information on the artist's working methods and to add to the database at the Van Gogh Museum in Amsterdam. A painted-out flying bird was discovered. A related painting made the same year, Cart with Red and White Ox, is in the Kröller-Müller Museum in Otterlo, the Netherlands.

See also
List of works by Vincent van Gogh
Cart with Red and White Ox

References

External links 
 

1884 paintings
Cattle in art
Collection of the Portland Art Museum
Paintings by Vincent van Gogh
Paintings in Portland, Oregon